The 2015–16 PGA Tour was the 101st season of the PGA Tour, and the 49th since separating from the PGA of America. The season began on October 15, 2015.

Changes for 2015–16
A number of events changed dates due to the 2016 Summer Olympics. In addition, the RSM Classic (formerly the McGladrey Classic) and the Valero Texas Open expanded their fields to 156.

Schedule
The following table lists official events during the 2015–16 season.

Unofficial events
The following events were sanctioned by the PGA Tour, but did not carry FedEx Cup points or official money, nor were wins official.

Location of tournaments

Money leaders
The money list was based on prize money won during the season, calculated in U.S. dollars.

Awards

See also
2015 in golf
2016 in golf
2016 Web.com Tour
2016 PGA Tour Champions 
2016 European Tour

Notes

References

External links

PGA Tour seasons
PGA Tour
PGA Tour